Eva Dorrepaal (born 17 October 1970) is a Dutch actress. She appeared in more than forty films since 1993. On a number of films Dorrepaal collaborated with director Edwin Brienen.

Selected filmography

References

External links 

1970 births
Living people
Dutch film actresses
People from Leiden
21st-century Dutch actresses